was a renowned Japanese photographer.

References

Japanese photographers
1861 births
1896 deaths